Elin Améen was a Swedish author.

Biography 
Améen was born in 1852 in Karlskrona to Vilhelmina and Georg Améen, as one of three children, having two brothers. Her father Georg was a prominent government official and publisher. Améen made her writing debut in 1885 with short stories published in the book  (Bondage and other stories and sketches) published by the Albert Bonniers company, though it did not sell well. Despite the poor sales of her book, she was appointed to the new women's cultural organisation Sällskapet Nya Idun (The New Idun Society), a women's counterpart to the men's club Sällskapet Idun (The Idun Society). 

In 1891 Améen's first successful work,  (Life Goals), a collection of stories and sketches, was published.  included the short story  (Freed) which was also published in the magazine .  was later turned into a successful play in English called Alan's Wife by the American actress Elizabeth Robins, which Améen had translated back into Swedish and staged eventually at the Royal Dramatic Theater in Stockholm. Améen was also published extensively in the Swedish press under the pen names EA, Elisa, Lina and Mn.

Améen suffered ill health for most of her life, particularly in her final decade. She died in Stockholm in 1913.

References

Further reading 
 Lynn R Wilkinson: "Sketching modernity: Elin Améen's "Träldom" and "Lifsmål"" in: Scandinavica (42):2, 2003

 
1852 births
1913 deaths
19th-century Swedish women writers
Members of Nya Idun